Pavagadh Hill is situated within a plain in Panchmahal district, Gujarat, western India. A volcanic eruption occurred in the region approximately 500 million years ago and the etymology of Pavagadh is associated with this eruption: Pav-gadh means "one fourth hill" or "fire-hill". At its base is the historical city of Champaner, while the hill station of Pavagadh was built upon the volcanic cone itself. Known for its forts, there are also dozens of heritage structures on the hill.

Faith based legend surrounding Pavagadh formation suggests that the right foot of Sati is believed to have fallen at Pavagadh, thus forming a deep valley and the God later on "sent a large hill as per the request of Rishi Vishwamitra to fill up this deep valley so that the sage's sacred cows do not fall into it." Thus Kalika Mata Temple at Pavagadh is one of the holiest of Shaktipeets in Indian subcontinent."

Geography

The Dhadhar River and Vishwamitri River originate on the hill. The Surya stream, which also rises on the hill, joins the Vishvamitri. There are five successive plateaus, Kalikamata Plateau, Mauliya Plateau, Bhadrakali Plateau, Machi Plateau and Atak Plateau. Plateau reservoirs (talaos) form a chain up the hill. Other features include dense forest, reddish-orange rhyolite boulders, and a natural cave just below the summit. Strong monsoon breezes blow winds upwards onto steep hill slopes.

The arrangement of the rock formations of Pavagadh Hill is stated as being "rhyolite, green bedded tuffs, porphyritic basalt, olivine dolerite and nonporphyritic alkaline basalt." There are steep rock exposures whose geological formation is attributed to ancient volcanic eruptions and lava flows. Pavagadh Hill has a geological setting of reddish-yellow coloured stone, and is considered to be one of the oldest rock formations in India.

The geological formation of Pavagadh Hill is thus very complex. It is interpreted as part of the Deccan Traps, which arose from the "tumultuous outpour of lava beyond 106 cubic km in volume. Eruption is deduced to have occurred 69-65 Ma age. These basaltic rocks said to be one of the largest continental flood basaltic provinces in the world." Studies carried by geologists have indicated eleven basic flows superposed by felsic volcanics. New varieties of rocks such as "rhyodycite, alkal-olivine basalt, mugearite and ankaramite" are reported. It is also recorded that except for rhyolite, all the rocks have an "alkaline-oloivine lineage." Geologists have also observed that "seventeen horizontal flows have occurred in Pavagadh" and postulated that the "whole series resulted by fractionalism in two episodes."

The highest point of the hill presents an undulating forested topography in the direction of Jambughoda. The path ascending the hill passes through many old gates and cuts through natural ledges of rock like a staircase, with precipitous sides. Midway up this path is a flat ground which is strewn with boulders. The mountain above the flat ground is a very steep hill scarp.

Transportation

While private vehicles are not allowed, registered buses and government vehicles provide transportation up the hill. As the road ends before reaching the summit, there are only two options to reach the top, either on foot or by ropeway. It can carry 1,200 people per hour. It is stated to be the country's highest ropeway, connecting the summit of the hill with the plateaus of Champaner.

History and legends
As per Jain texts, it is believed as a salvation place of Lav and Kush (son of Ramachandra). In recent history, human settlement occurred around the second century after the hill became associated with the goddess Kali. It is believed that the foot of Parvati fell on this hill, making it sacred. Legend states that the hill's formation is attributed to the sage Vishwamitra Rishi, who lived here in bygone days. He had a cow named Kamadhenu. One day, the cow slipped while grazing and fell into the valley, which resulted in the cow attempting to scramble up the hill. Finally she produced milk, which filled the valley, and swam to higher ground. The Rishi learned of the mishap, and in order to prevent any such incident in the future, he prayed to the gods to fill the valley. The gods fulfilled his prayers with one fourth of a hill projecting out of the plains, Pavagadh Hill.

Known for its forts, there are also dozens of heritage structures on the hill. It is part of the Champaner-Pavagadh Archaeological Park, a UNESCO World Heritage Site.

Jain Temple

The temples of Jainism at Pavagadh are also noteworthy. They are of three groups: The first consists of the Bhavanaderi temples near the Naqqarkhana gate called the Navalakka temples, the second group is in honour of the tirthankaras Suparshvanatha and Chandraprabhu and the third group, situated on the south east of Pavagarh Hill (Mataji's cliff), is near the Pārśva temple next to the Dudhia tank. On the basis of their "stylistic and architectural features", the date of construction of these temples is deduced to be the 14th–15th centuries. The temple is made up of pure white stone with elaborately carved seated and standing images of the Jain pantheon are seen on the outer walls of the temples. The Garbabrihas are enshrined with beautiful stone images of tirthankaras in these temples. All the temples have been renovated over time. The temple also has a 30 ft. tall statue of God Bahubali stands tall in its vicinity.

The Greek geographer Ptolemy many centuries ago in his work regarded this temple as an ancient and holy place. In 1480 Mahmud Begada, the Muslim sultan of Gujarat, heavily damaged this temple. In 1880 this temple was repaired. The entire complex houses a Dharmshala or guesthouse, a Jain restaurant and gardens.

References

Hills of Gujarat
Tourist attractions in Panchmahal district
Champaner-Pavagadh Archaeological Park
Aravalli Range
14th-century Jain temples